Kadem (Kadam) river is a tributary of Godavari located in the Nirmal District of Telangana near the village of Pandwapur (Pandapur or Pandavapur)

Origin and Course 
The river rises near Bazarhatnoor in the Adilabad District and flows south-east wards.
The Kuntala Waterfall are formed on this river at Kuntala. It provides for a famous one day outing for Hyderabad.
The Kaddam Project is a Major Reservoir across river Kadem, a tributary river of Godavari near Kaddam Mandal, Adilabad District, Telangana. Beyond the project the river flows in a linear fashion into the Godavari.

References 

Rivers of Telangana
Tributaries of the Godavari River
Rivers of India